Jacques Joseph LeBlanc is a Canadian politician, who was elected to the Legislative Assembly of New Brunswick in the 2018 election. He represents the electoral district of Shediac-Beaubassin-Cap-Pelé as a member of the Liberal Party.

LeBlanc was re-elected in 2020 provincial election.

Prior to his election to the legislature, LeBlanc served as mayor of Shediac.

Electoral record

References

Living people
New Brunswick Liberal Association MLAs
21st-century Canadian politicians
Mayors of places in New Brunswick
Year of birth missing (living people)